El Presidente: General Emilio Aguinaldo Story and the First Philippine Republic, (Spanish: El Presidente: Historia del General Emilio Aguinaldo y la Primera República de Filipinas; Tagalog: Ang Pangulo: Kuwento ni Heneral Emilio Aguinaldo at ang Unang Republika ng Pilipinas) or simply El Presidente (English: The President), is a 2012 biographical film written and directed by Mark Meily about the life of General Emilio Aguinaldo, the first president of the Philippine Republic. The film stars Jeorge "E.R." Ejercito Estregan in the title role, along with Nora Aunor, Christopher de Leon, Cristine Reyes, and Cesar Montano.

The film was one of the official entries to the 2012 Metro Manila Film Festival and was released in theaters nationwide on December 25, 2012. Produced by Scenema Concept International, CMB Films and Viva Films, in cooperation with San Miguel Corporation, Petron Corporation, Boy Scouts of the Philippines, Las Casas Filipinas de Acúzar, and the Film Development Council of the Philippines, it premiered on December 18, 2012, at the SM Mall of Asia's SMX Convention Center.

Plot
The story is told in flashbacks as Emilio Aguinaldo (E.R. Ejercito) thanks the United States government for giving him the opportunity to attend the full restoration of Philippine independence on July 4, 1946.

The film begins with his capture by Kapampangan and U.S. forces under General Frederick Funston's command in 1901, then flashes back to 1886, when an old woman gives Aguinaldo and his childhood friend Cándido Tirona (Ronnie Lazaro) cryptic prophecies. Ten years later, Aguinaldo is inducted into the Katipunan by the Supremo, Andrés Bonifacio, and later assumes leadership of its Cavite chapter the Magdalo while becoming mayor of Cavite El Viejo. When trouble breaks out in Manila in late August 1896, Aguinaldo tries to assure the Spanish provincial government of non-interference and covertly marshals his forces despite a lack of weapons. Learning that the Spanish mostly put their forces in Manila, Aguinaldo finally mobilizes his troops in Cavite and takes on Spanish troops at Cavite El Viejo, Imus, and Binakayan.

As the Katipunan rebels gain ground in Cavite and several provinces, its Magdalo and Magdiwang factions convene to elect a provisional government. Bonifacio oversees the Tejeros Convention, which elects Aguinaldo as president, Mariano Trías as vice-president, and himself as interior minister. He storms out of the convention when Daniel Tirona objects to his position. Aguinaldo's brother Críspulo informs him of his accession and convinces him to leave his troops just as he was seeking to defend against the Spaniards at Pasong Santol. However without reinforcement they were overrun and Crispulo was killed. Meanwhile, an embittered Bonifacio establishes his own revolutionary government in Naic and was later arrested during his act in the village. Aguinaldo is concerned about Bonifacio's actions and wanted him exiled, but the War Council advises his execution.

Several months later, Aguinaldo leaves Cavite with most of his forces intact and makes it to Biak-na-Bato in Bulacan, where he signs the Pact of Biak-na-Bato and heads for Hong Kong. There he meets with U.S. officials who approach him with offers of support and recognition of a new Philippine republic amidst the Spanish–American War. Aguinaldo returns to the Philippines winning his military victory under the First Philippine Republic and formally declares independence from Spain. As the Malolos Congress convenes, Felipe Agoncillo tries to represent the new nation at the Treaty of Paris negotiations, but gets stonewalled at every turn even as U.S. forces gradually arrive in the Philippines.

War with the Americans breaks out in February 1899, and General Antonio Luna is appointed supreme commander of the army. He is assassinated by disgruntled troops three months later, and the Filipino forces are gradually routed by the Americans. As a result, Aguinaldo flees to the north of Luzon. General Gregorio del Pilar volunteers to hold them off at Tirad Pass and buy Aguinaldo time. His loyal courier is later captured by the Americans while getting some medicine for his son. Now aware of Aguinaldo's hideout, Funston plans his capture.

Having been made to accept the American occupation over the Philippines, Aguinaldo lives a quiet life, which is marred by Hilaria's death in 1921. He meets and marries Agoncillo's niece María in 1930. Over the next few decades, the couple witness Philippine history unfold once more as he is defeated in the 1935 presidential elections, Japanese occupation, and the restoration of full independence. In 1962, an elderly Aguinaldo and his wife comfort each other over President Diosdado Macapagal's decree to restore the actual date of the Philippine declaration of independence.

As Aguinaldo lies on his bed, the same woman who gave him his prophecy appears to him one more time.

Cast

Jeorge "E.R." Ejercito Estregan as Gen. Emilio Aguinaldo
Jericho Ejercito as young Emilio Aguinaldo
Nora Aunor as María Agoncillo
Christopher de Leon as Gen. Antonio Luna
Cesar Montano as Andrés Bonifacio
Cristine Reyes as Hilaria Aguinaldo
Alicia Meyer as the Old Lady/Inang Bayan (Mother Land)
Ronnie Lazaro as Gen. Cándido Tirona
Mav Lozano as Young Cándido Tirona
Bayani Agbayani as Gen. Baldomero Aguinaldo
Gerard Ejercito as Gen. Críspulo Aguinaldo
Allan Paule as Gen. Tomás Mascardo
Emilio Garcia as Gen. Pío del Pilar
Wendell Ramos as Gen. Mariano Noriel
John Arcilla as Gen. Mariano Trías
Mike Lloren as Vicente Riego de Dios
Ian de Leon as Capt. Artemio Ricarte
Felix Roco as Gen. Gregorio del Pilar
Dindo Arroyo as Gen. Macario Sakay
Ricardo Cepeda as Col. Lucio de Vega
Lorenzo Mara as Dr. Dominador Gómez
Carlos Morales as Gen. León Villafuerte
Alireza Libre as Gen. Edilberto Evangelista
Richard Manabat as Ambrosio Rianzares Bautista
Gary Estrada as Comdr. José Tagle
Allen Dizon as Comdr. Simeón Villa
Will Devaughn as Comdr. Agapito Bonzón
Crispin Pineda as José P. Elises
Hero Bautista as Major Lázaro Macapagal
Andro Morgan as Major Eugenio
Yul Servo as Pedro Paterno
William Martinez as Dr. Santiago Barcelona
Ronnie Quizon as Apolinario Mabini
Epi Quizon as José Clemente Zulueta
Alvin Anson as Felipe Agoncillo
Lou Veloso as Julián Felipe
Sid Lucero as Gaudioso
Sunshine Cruz as Gregoria de Jesús
Joko Diaz as Procopio Bonifacio
Rommel Montano as Ciriaco Bonifacio
Archie Adamos as Luis Aguado
Soliman Cruz as Máximo Inocencio
Roi Vinzon as Lázaro Segovia
Dennis Padilla as Tal Placido
John Regala as Padre Agustín
Baron Geisler as Lt. Chacón
Ian Veneracion as Gen. Ernesto Aguirre
Tony Mabesa as Gen. Echaluche
Troy Montero as Col. Frederick Funston
James Paolleli as Gen. Arthur MacArthur
Recto Cantimbulan as Padre Cenón Villafranca
Joonee Gamboa as Amb. Felipe Buencamino
Mark Meily as Presidente ng Indang
Roldan Aquino as María Agoncillo's father
Gloria Sevilla as María Agoncillo's mother
Lariel Castro as Cecilio
Darry dela Cruz as Igorot
Elaine Lozano as Sor Gallego
Maita Ejercito as Marcela Agoncillo
Jhulia Ejercito as Lorenza Agoncillo
Leah Villalon as older Lorenza Agoncillo
Jenny Javier as Delfina Herbosa de Natividad
Maylyn Enriquez as Felicidad Aguado
Melissa Yotoko as Consuelo Almiránez
Jess Evardone as Severino de las Alas
Bearwin Meily as Benjamín San Luis
Emmanuelle Ejercito as Gregorio Jocson
Chris Perris as Capt. Harry Hill Bandholtz
Brenton Metken as Rousenville Wildman
Henry Strzalkowski as Gen. Francis Greene
Oliver Borlen as Théophile Delcassé
Allan Pérez as Governor-General Ramón Blanco
Ces Aldabe as Mariano Álvarez
Don Umali as Daniel Tirona
Arkin da Silva as Ariston Villanueva
Mario Capalad as Santiago Álvarez
Arian Labios as Pedro Girón
Jojo Gallego as José del Rosario
Eddie del Mar as Jacinto Lumbre
Romeo Edgar Ambrogar as Emiliano Riego de Dios
Sonny Alcantara as Pío Valenzuela
Jomar Daynt as Col. Pedro Lipana
Jun Nayra as Mariano Riego de Dios
Rogelio Aldo Yadao as Col. Paco Román
Perry Dizon as Capt. Pedro Janolino
Eric Perez as Padre Fidel de Bias
Johnny Barnes as Felipe Calderón
Roger Clarico as Legarda
Ace Mangamon as Flavio

Development
A 350-page script emerged in 1998, with the proposed film meant for the Philippines' Independence Centennial, but no production was made.

Ejercito said Meily was chosen to direct the film due to his knowledge of Aguinaldo, experience in large productions, and personal belief in him. Meily's appointment was made despite swearing never to helm a historical film again, after working on Baler in 2008. Ejercito's second choice for director was Mario O'Hara; the latter died before Ejercito made him an offer, on June 26, 2012. Ejercito ruled out picking Tikoy Aguiluz because a falling-out between them during the editing of his last film, Manila Kingpin.

Despite the existence of the 1998 script, Meily opted to create an entirely different script instead. He wanted to hire screenwriters at Ejercito's request, but volunteered to write it himself when no writers joined the project. Meily claims he tried to make the film as factually accurate as possible, and he describes the finished product as "95 percent" accurate to what really happened. Historians were on set to ensure full accuracy.

Ejercito described the film as much harder to make than Manila Kingpin because it "deals directly with our country's history." Over 50 professional actors and actresses were cast for the movie. He also described the "set, costumes, locations, and logistics" as "staggering by all Philippine cinema standards." Shooting took place over 43 days at select locations in Cavite, Laguna, and Bulacan.

Release
El Presidente, along with seven other Metro Manila Film Festival entries, was released on December 25, 2012, in 54 theaters, although it was premiered on December 18, 2012, at the SMX Convention Center at the SM Mall of Asia. It went on to gross PhP4.2 million in Metro Manila, the sixth most among MMFF films. After the film festival ended, the Metro Manila Development Authority did not release the total box office gross of the film as it was not in the top four highest grossing films. Ejercito complained that the film's low box office gross was due to rigged theater distribution, as more popular films were released in as many as 130 theaters. While all eight film festival entries were released in the same number of theaters in Metro Manila via drawing lots, theaters in the province could decide whichever movies to show.

Critical reception
The movie garnered mostly positive reviews from critics. The Philippines' Cinema Evaluation Board graded the film an A, and it has been endorsed by the government's Department of Education, the Commission on Higher Education, and the Film Development Council of the Philippines.

In a review, Phillip Cu-Unjieng of the Philippine Star said it "vividly recaptures" one of the Philippines' most turbulent periods in history by exposing the infighting among the Katipunan's members and how Aguinaldo wanted to resolve them. He noted that the film's quality makes it almost stand out as much as Richard Attenborough's Gandhi, Steven Spielberg's Lincoln, and Martin Scorsese's The Aviator. Philibert Ortiz-Dy of ClickTheCity.com, on the other hand, gave the film two and a half stars out of five, describing El Presidente as "deeply flawed as an entertainment, but there's a lot in it to like." While he did note the film was ambitious, he also stated that the "lack of focus hurts it in the end", due to its large scope.

Rommel R. Llanes of the Philippine Entertainment Portal especially praised the performances of Montano and de Leon as Bonifacio and Luna, respectively. However, he also stated that Ejercito occasionally felt like Asiong Salonga, the main character of his previous film, Manila Kingpin. Maridol Rañoa-Bismark, writing for Yahoo! Philippines, highly praised the film for "its breathtaking cinematography, well-choreographed fight scenes, haunting music and brilliant acting", but mostly for it being about the "triumph of good over evil."

Columnist and radio show host Jessica Zafra, however, was critical of the movie's treatment. She said the depiction of Bonifacio's death raised questions about its authenticity. She added that the film itself "does Emilio Aguinaldo a disservice by portraying him as a victim of circumstance" and even highlighted the "amnesia" prevalent among contemporary Filipinos.

The movie garnered the most awards at the 2012 Metro Manila Film Festival, winning the plums for Second Best Picture, Best Supporting Actor (Cesar Montano), Youth Choice Award, Best Float, Best Sound, Best Musical Score, and Best Make-up.

Awards and recognition

References

External links

2012 films
Biographical films about military leaders
Cultural depictions of Andrés Bonifacio
Cultural depictions of Apolinario Mabini
Cultural depictions of Emilio Aguinaldo
Films about presidents of the Philippines
Films about rebellions in the Philippines
Films set during the Philippine–American War
Films set in the 1880s
Films set in the 1890s
Films set in the 1900s
Films set in the 1930s
Films set in the 1940s
Films shot in Bulacan
Films shot in Cavite
Films shot in Laguna (province)
Philippine biographical films
Philippine political thriller films
Films directed by Mark Meily